Kim Yoo-suk (born 19 January 1982) is a South Korean pole vaulter.

He finished ninth at the 2003 Universiade. He also competed at the 2004 Olympic Games and the 2005 World Championships without reaching the final.

His personal best jump is 5.66 metres, achieved in July 2005 in Livermore.

Competition record

References
 

1982 births
Living people
South Korean male pole vaulters
Athletes (track and field) at the 2004 Summer Olympics
Athletes (track and field) at the 2008 Summer Olympics
Athletes (track and field) at the 2012 Summer Olympics
Olympic athletes of South Korea
Athletes (track and field) at the 2006 Asian Games
Athletes (track and field) at the 2010 Asian Games
Asian Games medalists in athletics (track and field)
Asian Games silver medalists for South Korea
Medalists at the 2010 Asian Games
Competitors at the 2003 Summer Universiade
Competitors at the 2005 Summer Universiade
Sportspeople from Gwangju